Ryan Frank Wintle (born 13 June 1997) is an English professional footballer who plays as a midfielder for Cardiff City. He has previously played for Alsager Town and Crewe Alexandra; in August 2021, he was loaned by Cardiff to Blackpool for a four-month loan spell.

Career

Crewe Alexandra
Wintle began his career with North West Counties Football League side Alsager Town and then joined Crewe Alexandra in January 2015, making his professional debut on 14 November 2015, coming on as a second-half substitute in a 2–0 League One defeat at Bradford City. He scored his first league goal on 22 April 2017, at Gresty Road against Leyton Orient.

After playing in the opening 10 games of the 2017–18 season, Wintle was injured in the 11th, a home defeat by Carlisle United on 23 September 2017, sustaining a stress fracture of his tibia that ruled him out "for months". He returned to first team action in January 2018, and scored his second league goal at Swindon Town on 27 January.

After a difficult first half of the 2018–19 season that saw Crewe hover around the relegation zone, manager David Artell switched to a 4-3-3 formation which coincided with an upturn in both the team and Wintle's form. Crewe's post-Christmas run included victories over high-flying Lincoln City, Milton Keynes Dons, Carlisle United, Colchester United and Mansfield Town. This pulled Crewe Alexandra away from the relegation scrap, and gave the club an outside chance of a play-off push. Wintle was considered one of the club's best performers during this run.

With four goals in 46 appearances, Wintle then helped Crewe to promotion in the COVID-19-affected 2019–20 season, and he added two further goals in 48 appearances as Crewe ended the following season in 12th place in League One. On 13 May 2021, Crewe announced that it had offered Wintle a new contract, but as Wintle had previously shunned new contract offers, Artell expected him to move to another club.

Cardiff City
On 23 June 2021, Wintle signed a three-year contract with Cardiff City. He made his Cardiff debut on 7 August 2021, coming on as a second-half substitute for Joe Ralls in a 1–1 draw against Barnsley. He scored his first Cardiff goal in the club's 3–1 win at Wigan Athletic on 8 October 2022.

Blackpool (loan)
Wintle joined Blackpool on loan on 28 August 2021 for the remainder of the 2021–22 season, making his debut in a 1–0 win over Fulham at Bloomfield Road on 11 September 2021. However, the loan deal had a January 2022 recall option and Wintle returned to Cardiff on 3 January 2022 after playing 18 games for the Seasiders.

Career statistics

Honours
Individual
Crewe Alexandra Player of the Year: 2019–20

References

External links

Alsager profile at Football Mitoo

1997 births
Sportspeople from Newcastle-under-Lyme
Living people
English footballers
English Football League players
Alsager Town F.C. players
Crewe Alexandra F.C. players
Cardiff City F.C. players
Blackpool F.C. players
Association football midfielders